York Township, Ohio may refer to:

York Township, Athens County, Ohio
York Township, Belmont County, Ohio
York Township, Darke County, Ohio
York Township, Fulton County, Ohio
York Township, Medina County, Ohio
York Township, Morgan County, Ohio
York Township, Sandusky County, Ohio
York Township, Tuscarawas County, Ohio
York Township, Union County, Ohio
York Township, Van Wert County, Ohio

See also
York Township (disambiguation)

Ohio township disambiguation pages